

Events 
 January – Antonio Vivaldi conducts a festival to celebrate the 100th anniversary of the opening of the Schouwburg theater.
 4 May – Foundation of the Imperial Ballet School at Saint Petersburg, with Jean-Baptiste Landé as its principal.
 Carl Philipp Emanuel Bach, having completed a law degree, is hired as a court musician by Crown Prince Frederick of Prussia, the future Frederick the Great (Bach will remain in Frederick's service until 1768).

Classical music 
Johann Sebastian Bach 
Kyrie–Gloria masses, BWV 233–236
Harpsichord Concerto No.3 in D major, BWV 1054
Francesco Durante – Messa piccola di requiem in G
George Frideric Handel – La bianca rosa, HWV 160c
Leonardo Leo 
Cello Concerto in A major, L.50
Cello Concerto in D minor, L.60
 Jan Dismas Zelenka – Miserere, ZWV 57

Opera
Thomas Arne – Comus
Antonio Bioni – Girita
François Francoeur and François Rebel – Le Ballet de la paix (Paris, Opéra, 29 May)
George Frideric Handel 
Faramondo
Saul (composed, first performed 1739)
Serse (London, 15 April)
Johann Adolph Hasse – Irene
Giovanni Battista Pescetti – La Conquista del Vello D'Oro
Nicola Porpora – Carlo il Calvo
Giovanni Porta – Ifigenia in Aulide
Francesco Maria Veracini – Rosalinda

Publications 
Joseph Bodin de Boismortier – L'Automne, Op. 5, No. 3 (extract, reprinted from Cantates françoises, Op. 5 [1724])
Josse Boutmy – Pièces de clavecin, Livre 1
Giuseppe Antonio Brescianello – 12 Concertos, Op. 1
Michele Corrette 
L'école d'Orphée, Op. 18 (Paris)
Les délices de la solitude, Op. 20 (Paris)
 George Frideric Handel – 6 Organ Concertos, Op.4 (London: John Walsh)
Alessandro Marcello – La cetra di Eterio Stinfalico, 6 concertos for 2 oboes or flutes, strings, and basso continuo (Augsburg, [approximate year])
 Domenico Scarlatti 
 Essercizi per Gravicembalo, K.1-30
 42 Suites de Pièces pour le Clavecin, K.1-42 (introduction by Roseingrave)
Giuseppe Sammartini – 6 Concerti Grossi, Op. 2
Georg Philipp Telemann 
Fugues légères & petits jeux, TWV 30:21–26
18 Canons Mélodieux, TWV 40:118–123
6 Nouveaux quatuors en six suites: à une flûte traversiere, un violon, une basse de viole, où violoncel, et basse continuë. Paris: L'auteur, Vater, Boivin, et Le Clerc. ("Paris quartets" Nos. 7–12), TWV 43:D3, 43:a2, 43:G4, 43:h2, 43:A3, 43:e4
 Johann Gottfried Walther – Harmonisches Denck- und Danckmahl
 6 Harpsichord Concertos and 4 Organ Fugues (Strasbourg: Jean Daniel Doulsecker) works by various and anonymous composers. Contains Wilhelm Friedemann Bach's Fugue in F major F.36.

Methods and theory writings 
 Johann Philipp Eisel – Musicus autodidaktos

Births 
April 17 – Philip Hayes, composer (died 1797)
May – Jonathan Battishill, composer (died 1801)
June 3 – Pierre Vachon, composer (died 1803)
August 11 (baptized)– Anna Bon, composer (died after 1769)
August 14 – Leopold Hofmann, composer (died 1793)
October 26 – Louis-Charles-Joseph Rey, composer and cellist, (died 1811)
November 15 – William Herschel, astronomer and composer (died 1822)
December 14 – Jan Antonín Koželuh, composer (died 1814)
date unknown
Carlo Besozzi, oboist and composer (died 1791)
Thomas Ebdon, organist and composer (died 1811)

Deaths 
January 6 – Franz Xaver Murschhauser, German composer (born 1663)
January 17 – Jean-François Dandrieu, harpsichordist, organist and composer (born c. 1682)
March 25 – Turlough O'Carolan, harpist and composer (born 1670)
July 20 – Tommaso Redi, composer (born c.1675)
August 23 – Baron Anders von Düben, director of the Royal Swedish Orchestra (born 1673)
August 29 – Georg Reutter, organist and composer (born 1656)
September 23 – Carlo Agostino Badia, opera composer (born 1672)
December 22 – Jean-Joseph Mouret, composer (born 1681)
date unknown – José de Torres, composer (born 1665)

References

1738 in music
18th century in music
Music by year